Lynne Kelly may refer to:
Lynn Kelly (born 1957), is a New Zealand jewellery designer
Lynne Kelly (born 1951), Australian science writer, researcher and science educator.
Lynne Kelly Hoenig (born 1969), American fiction writer for children and young adults.